Sillyŏnp'o station is a railway station in Sil-li, Sunch'ŏn city, South P'yŏngan province, North Korea, on the P'yŏngra Line of the Korean State Railway. It is also the starting point of the Taegŏn Line to Oedong via Taegŏn, where it connects to the Ŭnsan Line.

It was originally opened by the Chosen Government Railway on 1 October 1929 as Pongha station, as part of the second extension of the P'yŏngwŏn Line. It received its current name after the establishment of the DPRK.

References

Railway stations in North Korea